The 2017–18 Michigan Wolverines men's hockey team was the Wolverines' 96th season. They represented the University of Michigan in the 2017–18 NCAA Division I men's ice hockey season. The team was coached by Mel Pearson, in his first year as head coach, and played their home games at Yost Ice Arena. This season was the beginning of a new era, as long time head coach Red Berenson retired after 33 years of service as coach at Michigan. Michigan advanced to the Frozen Four for the first time since 2011, but lost to Notre Dame in the national semifinals after captain Jake Evans scored the game-winning goal with six seconds remaining.

When the team reached the Frozen Four it marked the sixth time a school had reached the final four of the NCAA Men's Ice Hockey Championship and NCAA Division I men's basketball tournament in the same season: Michigan (1964, 1992*, 1993* and 2018) and Michigan State (1999 and 2001).

Previous season
During the 2016–17 ice hockey season Michigan went 13–19–3, including 6–12–2 in Big Ten Play. Michigan lost in the first round of the 2017 Big Ten men's ice hockey tournament to eventual tournament winner Penn State by a score of 4 to 1. Michigan missed out on the NCAA Hockey Tournament. At the end of the season head coach Red Berenson retired after 33 years of service as head coach of the Michigan Wolverines.

Roster
As of February 2, 2018

F

Coaching staff

Standings

Schedule and results
}
|-
!colspan="8" style="background:#; color:#;"| Exhibition

|-
!colspan="9" style="background:#; color:#;"| Regular season

|-
! colspan="9" style="background:#;|Big Ten Tournament

|-
! colspan="9" style="background:#;|NCAA Tournament

References

External links
 Official Website

Michigan
Michigan ice hockey
Michigan ice hockey
Michigan Wolverines men's ice hockey seasons
Michigan